Satyaveer Munna (born 3 June 1972) is an Indian politician, Member of Legislative Assembly (MLA) of Soraon, Uttar Pradesh, affiliated with Samajwadi Party. He is son of a former Union Minister and senior Indian National Congress leader late Dharmavir and brother of three times MP Shailendra Kumar.

In 2012, he was elected as MLA for Soraon defeating Bahujan Samaj Party's former minister Babulal Bhawra.

Personal life 
Satyaveer married in 2003 to Smt. Madhu Veer and the couple has a daughter Vedanshi born in 2005 and a son Vedant Aryan born in 2010.

See also 

List of people from Uttar Pradesh
2012 Uttar Pradesh assembly elections

References

External links

 

1972 births
Living people
Uttar Pradesh MLAs 2012–2017